Entre abogados te veas ("Among Lawyers I See You") is a 1951 Mexican film. It was produced by Fernando de Fuentes.

Cast
 Armando Calvo - El Abogangster
 Carmen Montejo - La Víctima
 Luis Beristáin - El Defensor
 Isabel del Puerto - La Amante
 Ramón Gay - El Catrín
 Sara Guasch - La Esposa
 Fernando Galiana - El Desfalcado
 Armando Espinosa - El Judío (as Armando Espinosa 'Periquin')
 Fernando Casanova - El Barrilete
 Rafael Estrada - El Bígamo
 Juan José Piñeiro - El Banquero (as Juan J. Piñeiro)
 Queta Lavat - La Segunda Esposa
 Juan Calvo - El Patrón
 Chel López - El Lider

External links
 

1951 films
1950s Spanish-language films
Mexican drama films
1951 drama films
Mexican black-and-white films
1950s Mexican films